Twin Peaks are a  double summit mountain located in the Chugach Mountains, in Matanuska-Susitna Borough in the U.S. state of Alaska. The nearest higher peak is Pioneer Peak,  to the northeast. Twin Peaks' descriptive name was reported by the United States Geological Survey in 1960, but the mountain was originally known as Lach Q'a in the Denaʼina language. Climbing the mountain involves scrambling with dangerous loose rock. The trailhead for the Twin Peaks Trail is located at the end of Eklutna Lake Road near the boat launch; however, the trail ends far short of the summit.

Climate

Based on the Köppen climate classification, Twin Peaks are located in a subarctic climate zone with long, cold, snowy winters, and mild summers. Temperatures can drop below −20 °C with wind chill factors below −30 °C. Precipitation runoff from the peak drains into tributaries of the Knik River.

See also

List of mountain peaks of Alaska
Geology of Alaska

References

Gallery

External links
 Twin Peaks weather: Mountain Forecast

Mountains of Alaska
Mountains of Matanuska-Susitna Borough, Alaska
North American 1000 m summits
Denaʼina